Rytis Sakalauskas (born 27 June 1987 in Alytus) is a track and field sprint athlete who competes internationally for Lithuania.

In 2010 he broke the world record in the seldom run indoor 150 m running event.

On 30 May 2010 at the Lausitzer Meeting Sakalauskas broke the 100 metres national record. After a few months, a new Lithuanian 100 metres record was set by Martynas Jurgilas. At the IAAF Diamond League Sakalauskas again broke the national record – 10.24. He broke the record again at the 2011 Lithuanian Championships with a time of 10.18.

At the 2012 European Championships held in Helsinki, Finland, Sakalauskas qualified for the final. The first start of the final was called back because Sakalauskas did not move upon start at all, which confused the starter. The second start was called back because Italy's Simone Collio moved too early and had to be disqualified. Again, at the third start Sakalauskas left himself behind the others and walked back to the start line without any intention of finishing the race. Before race Sakalauskas has announced that he wouldn't start at the final because of an injury he sustained after the semifinals.

Sakalauskas reached the semifinal of the 2014 and 2016 European Championship.

Personal bests

Achievements

References

1987 births
Living people
Lithuanian male sprinters
Sportspeople from Alytus
Athletes (track and field) at the 2012 Summer Olympics
Olympic athletes of Lithuania
Universiade medalists in athletics (track and field)
Universiade silver medalists for Lithuania
Medalists at the 2011 Summer Universiade